CD Player is a computer program that plays audio CDs using the computer's sound card. It was included in Windows 98, Windows NT 3.51, Windows NT 4.0 and Windows 2000 (as Deluxe CD Player). The program was also made available for Windows 95. It was removed from later versions of Windows starting with Windows ME, being replaced by Windows Media Player.

Features
When the CD Player is launched, it searches the computer's optical disc drive for CD audio tracks, looks up disc metadata with an Internet service and plays the CD. If no CD is inserted, one of the following error messages is returned by the program: Data or no disc loaded. or Please insert an audio compact disc.

CD Player's time display can be toggled between Track Time Elapsed, Track Time Remaining, and Disc Time Remaining. Tracks can be played in sequence or in random order. CD recognition, track and artist data can be manually entered and are re-displayed on next load. The database information is stored in a cdplayer.ini file which is limited to 64 kilobytes.

Deluxe CD Player
A modified version of CD Player with a different skin called Deluxe CD Player was also included in Microsoft Plus! for Windows 98, Windows 2000, Windows ME until "beta 3" stage and Windows XP (Whistler) until beta 2 build 2446.

As a feature upgrade to the standard CD Player, Deluxe CD Player was able to retrieve album metadata from the now defunct Tunes.com and Music Boulevard. The database information is stored in a DeluxeCD.mdb file, a Microsoft Access file format.

References

External links
CD-ROM Extras for Microsoft Windows 95 Upgrade
Microsoft's CD Players (Internet Archive copy)
GUIdebook - Screenshots of CD Player

Discontinued Windows components
Microsoft Windows multimedia technology
Tag editors
Windows media players
1998 software